was a Japanese author and academic.

Biography  

Uchida was born in Okayama to a family of sake brewers whose business later went bankrupt. His real name is Eizo Uchida (内田 榮造 Uchida Eizō). He became a pupil of Natsume Sōseki in 1911. He graduated from Tokyo University (Tokyo Imperial University) in 1914. He became professor of German at Imperial Japanese Army Academy in 1916. He later taught at Hosei University (Tokyo). He is the main subject of Akira Kurosawa's last film, . His novel,  is the inspiration for the film, Zigeunerweisen. In Japan he is well known as a passionate railfan and he made some works on railway travel. Though a great literary figure in Japan, he currently only has one book translated into English: Realm of the Dead (冥途 Meido). That volume also includes the collection Triumphal Entry into Ryojun. "Small Round Things", a translated excerpt from another collection, Jottings from the Goblins' Garden, appeared in the JAL inflight magazine Skyward in January 2006. He had two sons and three daughters.

Bibliography

Novels 
 (Realm of the Dead) (1922)
 (1934)
(1939)
(1939)
(1941)
 (1950)
 (1952–1956)

Essays
 (1933)
 (1933)
 (1934)
 (1941)
 (1946)
 (1951)
 (1957)
 (1971)

Children's literature 
 (1934)

Diary 
 (1935)
 (1937)
 (1955)

Haiku 
 (1934)
 (1943)

Film 
, Toho, 1939), starring Roppa Furukawa.
 (Toho, 1980), directed by Seijun Suzuki, starring Yoshio Harada, original novel Sarasāte no ban.
 (Daiei, 1993), directed by Akira Kurosawa, starring Tatsuo Matsumura.

Notes

See also 
Madadayo

External links

Hyakken Uchida's grave
Hyakken Uchida at J'Lit Books from Japan 
Synopsis of Realm of the Dead (Meido) at JLPP (Japanese Literature Publishing Project) 

1889 births
1971 deaths
People from Okayama
Japanese writers
University of Tokyo alumni
Academic staff of Hosei University
Japanese haiku poets